Spondylus candidus is a species of bivalve mollusc within the family Spondylidae. Its distribution covers areas near coasts of Australia and South Africa, and in the Red Sea where it lives in benthic environments at depths of 21 to 75 meters. Fossil occurrences have been found in the Quaternary of Djibouti and in the Miocene of Japan and Vanuatu.

References 

Bivalves described in 1819
Taxa named by Jean-Baptiste Lamarck
Molluscs of the Indian Ocean
Molluscs of the Pacific Ocean
Fauna of the Red Sea
Marine fauna of Australia
Marine fauna of Southern Africa
Spondylidae